John Ferrers may refer to:
John Ferrers (died 1680), Member of Parliament (MP) for Derbyshire
John Ferrers (died 1622), MP for Tamworth
John Ferrers (died 1633), MP for Tamworth

See also
John de Ferrers (disambiguation)